Chess is a two-player board game.

Chess or CHESS may also refer to:

Arts, entertainment, and media

Fictional characters
Chess (One Piece), a fictional character in Eiichirō Oda's manga
 Chess, a villain in the 2011 TV series The Cape
Chess Warmwater, a character in Reservation Blues by Sherman Alexie

Games
Chess (Mac OS)
Chess (Northwestern University), a pioneering chess program from the 1970s
Chess variants, including:
Business chess
Chaturanga, also named chatur or catur; an old variant
Fairy chess, standard chess with unusual pieces, rules, or board
Hiashatar, or Mongolian chess
Indian chess 
Janggi, or Korean chess
Jangju, or Manchu chess
Jetan, or Martian chess
Makruk, or Thai chess
Shatar, or Mongolian chess
Shatranj, or Persian chess
Shogi, sometimes called Japanese chess
Sittuyin, or Burmese chess 
Three-dimensional chess
Xiangqi, or Chinese chess
Chess Titans, a computer chess game with 3D graphics developed by Oberon Games and included in Windows Vista and Windows 7 Home Premium
GNU Chess,  a free software chess engine

Other uses in arts entertainment, and media
Chess (2006 film), a Malayalam film
Chess (2008 film), working title of the film Who Do You Love?
CHESS magazine, published monthly in the UK
Chess (musical)
Chess (poem), a c. 1565 poem by Jan Kochanowski
Chess Records, an American record label

Organizations
Army CHESS (Computer Hardware Enterprise Software and Solutions)
Chess Communication, a Norwegian mobile virtual network operator
Coalition of Higher Education Students in Scotland

Science and technology
Chess, a type of brome grass often considered a weed
Australian Clearing House and Electronic Sub-register System, an Australian electronic register of approved securities holdings
Cornell High Energy Synchrotron Source, a high-intensity X-ray lightsource

Other uses
Chess (surname)
Chess, a floorboard of a pontoon bridge
Chess pie
River Chess, in Buckinghamshire, England

See also
 Chess in early literature
 Topics in chess
 Glossary of chess
 History of chess
 Timeline of chess
 Outline of chess
 Chess piece (disambiguation)
 Chess player (disambiguation)
 Chinese chess (disambiguation)
 Viking chess (disambiguation)
 Cheese (disambiguation)